
 is Ai Otsuka's second single, which was released on December 17, 2003. It is often considered as Otsuka's breakthrough single and was used in 2004 as an ending theme song on the TV show, "," which Fuji TV produces.

Music video
The video for "Sakuranbo" begins by showing Ai in "her" bedroom which is predominantly red and white. A picture hanging on the wall shows a picture of a pair of cherries. Then we see Ai playing with her band in another room, which starts out blue but changes colour later in the song. We see Ai talking on the phone and drawing Love-Chan. Interspersed throughout the PV are bicycle scenes showing Ai with a man her age, two children and an older couple. The video closes on the picture of the two cherries hanging on the wall.

Track list

Sales
Initial week estimate: 6,730
Total estimate: 525,784

References
  
 2004 CD singles rankings at Oricon Style 

Ai Otsuka songs
2003 singles
Songs written by Ai Otsuka
Avex Trax singles
2003 songs
Songs about cherry blossom